Aurélien Clerc (born 26 August 1979) is a Swiss former professional road bicycle racer who last rode for UCI ProTour team . He retired from pro cycling after 2009, unable to find a new team, and started a new career as an insurance adviser. His sporting career began with Velo Club Cycliphile Bex.

Palmares 

2000
1st  Road race, National Under−23 Road Championships
1st Stage 5 Rheinland-Pfalz Rundfahrt
1st Stage 3 Vuelta a Navarra
2001
2nd Rominger Classic
6th Nokere Koerse
10th Rund um Düren
2002
Vuelta a Cuba
1st Stages 3, 4, 11 & 13
Tour de Picardie
1st Stages 2 & 3
1st Stage 1 Tour of Slovenia
1st Stage 1 Okolo Slovenska
1st Nokere Koerse
4th Giro del Lago Maggiore
6th Sparkassen Giro
2003
1st Stage 1 Tour de Picardie
5th GP de la Ville de Rennes
7th Overall Tour of Qatar
7th Nokere Koerse
9th Grote Prijs Jef Scherens
2004
1st Stage 4 Vuelta a Burgos
2005
6th Paris–Tours
6th Paris–Bourges
2006
1st Stage 2 Clásica Internacional de Alcobendas
3rd Overall Tour of Qatar
10th Paris–Bourges
2007
2nd Châteauroux Classic
2nd Paris–Bourges
4th Overall Circuit Franco-Belge
1st Stage 1
9th Paris–Tours
2008
1st Stage 1 Driedaagse van West-Vlaanderen
2nd Gent–Wevelgem
4th GP de la Ville de Rennes

References

External links 

Swiss male cyclists
1979 births
Living people
People from Vevey
Sportspeople from the canton of Vaud
20th-century Swiss people
21st-century Swiss people